Louis Manu Anderson (born 27 June 1985) is a New Zealand rugby league footballer who plays for Villegailhenc-Aragon XIII in the Elite Two Championship. A New Zealand former international representative forward, he previously played for the New Zealand Warriors in the National Rugby League competition and for the Catalans Dragons and Warrington Wolves in the Super League.

He is the brother of Vinnie and Fraser Anderson, and is a member of the Church of Jesus Christ of Latter-day Saints.

Anderson played for Warrington in their 2010 Challenge Cup Final victory over the Leeds Rhinos.
In 2011, he agreed a 3-year-deal with Catalans Dragons.

Background
Anderson was born in Dargaville, New Zealand.

Playing career
His junior clubs were the East Coast Bays Barracudas in Auckland and the Taniwharau Rugby League Club in Huntly.

He made his first grade début for the New Zealand Warriors against the Penrith Panthers at Ericsson Stadium on 28 March 2004.

Anderson represented the New Zealand national side and played for the Junior Kiwis. Anderson was named in the Tonga squad for the 2008 Rugby League World Cup but withdrew due to injury.

He played in the 2009 Challenge Cup Final  victory over Huddersfield and went back to back in the 2010 Challenge Cup Final victory over the Leeds Rhinos at Wembley Stadium.

Anderson was selected for the Exiles squad for the Rugby League International Origin Match against England at Headingley on 10 June 2011.

Legacy

References

External links
Catalans Dragons profile
Profile at warringtonwolves.com
Statistics at rugby-league.com

1985 births
Living people
Auckland rugby league team players
Catalans Dragons players
East Coast Bays Barracudas players
Exiles rugby league team players
New Zealand Latter Day Saints
New Zealand Māori rugby league players
New Zealand national rugby league team players
New Zealand sportspeople of Tongan descent
New Zealand rugby league players
New Zealand Warriors players
North Harbour rugby league team players
People educated at the Church College of New Zealand
Rugby league players from Dargaville
Rugby league second-rows
Taniwharau Rugby League Club players
Villegailhenc Aragon XIII players
Warrington Wolves players